Lala is a town and a town area committee in Hailakandi district in the Indian state of Assam.

Geography
It has an average elevation of 21 metres (69 feet).

Demographics
 India census, Lala had a population of 10,345. Males constitute 50% of the population and females 50%. Lala has an average literacy rate of 81%, higher than the national average of 59.5%: male literacy is 84%, and female literacy is 78%. In Lala, 11% of the population is under 6 years of age.

References

Hailakandi
Cities and towns in Hailakandi district